James Warwick (born 17 November 1947) is an English actor and director, best known for his roles on television and his theatre work in London's West End and New York's Broadway.

Early life
Warwick was born in Broxbourne, Hertfordshire, England.

Career

Television

Warwick has had leading roles in UK television including the detective series The Terracotta Horse (1973) and the BBC science fiction horror serial The Nightmare Man (1981) (co-starring with Celia Imrie). This was followed by a major guest role in the Doctor Who serial Earthshock (1982) as Lieutenant Scott. Other notable credits include Jason King, The Onedin Line, Lillie (with Francesca Annis), Rock Follies, Tales of the Unexpected, Howards' Way, Bergerac and Iris Murdoch's The Bell with Ian Holm.

Warwick appeared in several adaptations of the works of Agatha Christie including Why Didn't They Ask Evans? (1978) (alongside Francesca Annis), The Seven Dials Mystery (1981), Partners in Crime (1983) (alongside Francesca Annis as the sleuthing couple Tommy and Tuppence) and The Secret Adversary (1983) (also alongside Francesca Annis).

Warwick has also worked in American television, with guest starring roles in Scarecrow and Mrs. King, Civil Wars, Home Improvement, Murder, She Wrote, Babylon 5 and Alias amongst many others.

Theatre

His starring theatre roles included An Ideal Husband on Broadway, and King Arthur in the US national tour of Camelot. He played Brad in The Rocky Horror Show on stage in London for the first year of its run in addition to many leading roles in the West End and in regional theatres across the UK and America.

Warwick is a theatre director with credits from major theaters across the US. He served as associate director at the Chester Theatre Company, and directed many productions for them over the last twelve  years. He was Interim President of The American Academy of Dramatic Arts, Los Angeles campus 2007/8 and directed productions for their Company series. In 2009, James Warwick was appointed President of Theatre of Arts in Hollywood, California.

He has recently returned to his freelance theatre directing career with productions of The Government Inspector, Almost Maine for Bard College at Simon's Rock, and Halcyon Days and Folk for Chester Theatre Company. He also records for Audible and Alison Larkin Presents... most recently, The Mysterious Affair at Styles and a two-person recording of Oscar Wilde's The Importance of Being Earnest. He was awarded An Audible Earphones award for his recording of 'The Picture of Dorian Gray'. In 2018, James directed 'Mothers and Sons' for Shakespeare and Co. in Lenox MA for which he was awarded 'outstanding theatre director' of the year award from The Berkshire Theatre Critics Association.  His latest production at Shakespeare and Co. was 'The Children" by Lucy Kirkwood.

Other work

James Warwick was also a voice actor in the 1999 hit computer game Battlezone II: Combat Commander. He played the character of General Armond Braddock. He has also voiced Qui-Gon Jinn in many Star Wars video games, serving as the "audio double" for Liam Neeson.

References

External links
 

1947 births
Living people
English male stage actors
English male television actors
English male musical theatre actors
English male video game actors
English male voice actors
English theatre directors
People from Broxbourne
People with acquired American citizenship
Musicians from Hertfordshire
Male actors from Hertfordshire
20th-century English male actors
21st-century English male actors